St Michael's Church, Stanton by Bridge is a Grade I listed parish church in the Church of England in Stanton by Bridge, Derbyshire.

History

The church is medieval with elements from the 11th to the 13th century. It was rebuilt around 1682 by the Rector, Augustine Jackson. A further restoration was undertaken between 1865 and 1866 under the supervision of the architect Ewan Christian with the contractor being John Wood of Derby.. It reopened on 9 May 1866. New roofs were erected over the nave and chancel. The walls were cleaned removing the thick coating of lime. Open benches of white varnished deal  replaced the old pews, and an ornamental bell turret replaced the old wooden bell turret. Five stained glass windows by William Wailes of Newcastle were inserted.

Memorials

William Sacheverell (d. 1558)
Richard Francis (d. 1530)
Richard Sheppard (d. 1728) 
Thomas Shipton (d. 1711)

Parish status

The church is in a joint parish with:
St Michael with St Mary's Church, Melbourne
St James' Church, Smisby
St George's Church, Ticknall

Organ

The church contains a pipe organ by Brindley & Foster. A specification of the organ can be found on the National Pipe Organ Register.

See also
Grade I listed churches in Derbyshire
Grade I listed buildings in Derbyshire
Listed buildings in Stanton by Bridge

References

Church of England church buildings in Derbyshire
Grade I listed churches in Derbyshire
Ewan Christian buildings